The County of Dargo is one of the 37 counties of Victoria which are part of the cadastral divisions of Australia, used for land titles. It is located in Gippsland, between the Mitchell River in the west and the Tambo River in the east. Lake King is on the southern edge. It was gazetted in 1871. Earlier maps show the area as being part of a proposed County of Abinger.

Parishes 
Parishes include:
 Angora, Victoria
 Barroworn, Victoria
 Bemboka, Victoria
 Binnican, Victoria
 Birregun, Victoria
 Boonderoot, Victoria
 Broadlands, Victoria
 Bulgaback, Victoria
 Bullumwaal, Victoria
 Bumberrah, Victoria
 Caarneek, Victoria
 Carneek, Victoria
 Cooma, Victoria
 Cowa, Victoria
 Dargo, Victoria
 Doodwuk, Victoria
 Graham, Victoria
 Guttamurra, Victoria
 Jirnkee, Victoria
 Kalk Kalk, Victoria
 Kianeek, Victoria
 Koomberar, Victoria
 Kooroon, Victoria
 Moonip, Victoria
 Morekana, Victoria
 Mullawye, Victoria
 Nungatta, Victoria
 Nurong, Victoria
 Onyim, Victoria
 Quag-Munjie, Victoria
 Sarsfield, Victoria
 Tabberabbera, Victoria
 Tambo, Victoria
 Tarkeeth, Victoria
 Terlite-Munjie, Victoria
 Thornley, Victoria
 Tongio-Munjie West, Victoria
 Tyirra, Victoria
 Wamba, Victoria
 Wentworth, Victoria
 Wongungarra, Victoria
 Wuk Wuk, Victoria
 Wy-Yung, Victoria
 Yambulla, Victoria
 Yertoo, Victoria
 Yonduk, Victoria

References
Vicnames, place name details
Research aids, Victoria 1910
Map of the counties of Benambra, Tambo, Croajingolong and Dargo in Victoria showing county boundaries, parish boundaries, main roads, telegraph lines and railways. 1886, National Library of Australia

Counties of Victoria (Australia)